The Battle for the Bell is an American college football rivalry game between the University of Southern Mississippi Golden Eagles and Tulane University Green Wave football teams. The two schools are located about 110 miles from each other (Southern Miss in Hattiesburg, Mississippi, and Tulane in New Orleans, Louisiana) via Interstate 10 and Interstate 59, making for a heated game. 

Through the teams' most recent meeting in January 2020, Southern Miss holds a 23–9 lead in the series.

History
The two teams played annually from 1979 through 2006; both programs were independent through 1995, and both competed as members of Conference USA (C-USA) starting in 1996. In 1999, the series became a trophy game with the addition of the Bell. The series then went on hiatus due to Tulane's move to the American Athletic Conference (AAC) in July 2014.

On April 13, 2017, the schools announced a return of the rivalry—a four-game football series between 2022 and 2027, the first game scheduled for Yulman Stadium in New Orleans.

Prior to the regular-season series resuming, the two teams met in the 2020 Armed Forces Bowl (January) played in Fort Worth, Texas, which was a 30–13 Tulane victory. The bell trophy, which had been in the possession of Southern Miss since 2003, was transferred to the Green Wave after the game.

Game results

See also  
 List of NCAA college football rivalry games

References

College football rivalries in the United States
Southern Miss Golden Eagles football
Tulane Green Wave football